Clarias gariepinus or African sharptooth catfish is a species of catfish of the family Clariidae, the airbreathing catfishes.

Distribution 
They are found throughout Africa and the Middle East, and live in freshwater lakes, rivers, and swamps, as well as human-made habitats, such as oxidation ponds or even urban sewage systems.

The African sharptooth catfish was introduced all over the world in the early 1980s for aquaculture purposes, so is found in countries far outside its natural habitat, such as Brazil, Vietnam, Indonesia, and India.

Description 

The African sharptooth catfish is a large, eel-like fish, usually of dark gray or black coloration on the back, fading to a white belly. In Africa, this catfish has been reported as being second in size only to the vundu of the Zambesian waters, although FishBase suggests the African sharptooth catfish surpasses that species in both maximum length and weight.

These fish have slender bodies, flat bony heads, notably flatter than in the genus Silurus, and  broad, terminal mouths with four pairs of barbels. They also have large accessory breathing organs composed of modified gill arches. Also, only the pectoral fins have spines.

Habits 
It is a nocturnal fish like many catfish. It feeds on living, as well as dead, animal matter. Because of its wide mouth, it is able to swallow relatively large prey whole. It has been known to take large waterbirds such as the common moorhen. It is also able to crawl on dry ground to escape drying pools. Further, it is able to survive in shallow mud for long periods of time, between rainy seasons.

African catfish sometimes produce loud croaking sounds, not unlike the voice of the crow.

Natural spawning 
Spawning mostly takes place at night in the shallow, inundated areas of the rivers lakes and streams. Courtship is preceded by highly aggressive encounters between males. Courtship and mating takes place in shallow waters between isolated pairs of males and females. The male lies in a U-shape curved around the head of the female, held for several seconds. A batch of milt and eggs is released followed by a vigorous swish of the female's tail to distribute the eggs over a wide area. The pair usually rests after mating (from seconds up to several minutes) and then resumes mating.

Parental care for ensuring the survival of the catfish offspring is absent except by the careful choice of a suitable site. Development of eggs and larvae is rapid, and the larvae are capable of swimming within 48–72 hours after fertilization.

Rearing 
The rearing of the African sharptooth catfish in Africa started in the early 1970s in Central and Western Africa, as it was realized to be a very suitable species for aquaculture, as:

 It grows fast and feeds on a large variety of agriculture byproducts
 It tolerates adverse water quality conditions
 It can be raised in high densities, resulting in high net yields (6–16 t/ha/year).
 In most countries, it fetches a higher price than tilapia, as it can be sold live at the market
 It matures and relatively easily reproduces in captivity.
 It tolerates difficult conditions in aquaculture

Hybridisation 
Clarias gariepinus could be easily crossed with Heterobranchus longifillis to get the so-called hybrid Hetero-clarias. This cross has advantages over C. gariepinus:
 Cannot reproduce (so does not spend energy on reproduction)
 Has white meat (usually preferred by customers)
A major disadvantage of the Hetero-clarias hybrid, though, is its susceptibility to stress.

Parasites and diseases
C. gariepinus may host several species of digeneans, in addition to other endo- and ectoparasites.

References

External links
 Reproduction of African catfish
African catfish - RAS Fish farming system
 All Catfish Species Inventory
 Handbook on the rearing and artificial reproduction of the African catfish 
 The African catfish 
 Chari in the Bari, Homestead rearing of African catfish 

Clarias
Freshwater fish of Africa
Taxa named by William John Burchell
Fish described in 1822